The Southern Modified Race Tour (formerly known as Koma Unwind Modified Madness Series in 2014 & 2015)  was a modified stock car racing series that raced in the Southeastern United States. The series was formed in 2014 and is owned/operated by the Southern Modified Race Tour. The series features 2 classes of racing, the primary class (Modified) uses very similar rules package to the NASCAR Whelen Modified Tour, NASCAR Whelen Southern Modified Tour and other modified touring series in the northeastern United States. They also have a Mod Lite class that features similar rules package to the Modified Lite class at Caraway Speedway and to the Modified class at ACE Speedway and must declare their home track to 1 of those tracks. The series ceased operations following the 2016 season.

History
The series was created in the winter of 2013 - 2014 to have more races for Modified stock car racing in the Southeastern United States and under a similar format of the old Southern Modified Auto Racing Teams tour. A lot of drivers crossover between the Koma Unwind Series, NASCAR Whelen Southern Modified Tour and the local tracks of Bowman Gray Stadium, ACE Speedway, Caraway Speedway and other tracks & series in the Northeastern United States.

The series sponsor from 2014 & 2015 is Koma Unwind a Relaxation drink produced by Bebida Beverage Company.

Series champions

Venues

 - ACE Speedway - Altamahaw, North Carolina - (4/10 Mile Asphalt Oval)
 - Anderson Motor Speedway - Anderson, South Carolina - (3/8 Mile Asphalt Oval)
 - Carteret County Speedway - Cape Carteret, North Carolina - (4/10 Mile Asphalt Oval)
 - Coastal Plains Raceway Park - Jacksonville, North Carolina - (4/10 Mile Asphalt Oval)
 - Concord Speedway - Midland, North Carolina - (1/2 Mile Asphalt Oval)
 - Franklin County Speedway - Callaway, Virginia - (3/8 Mile Asphalt Oval)
 - Hickory Motor Speedway - Newton, North Carolina - (0.333 Mile Asphalt Oval)
 - Kingsport Speedway - Kingsport, Tennessee - (4/10 Mile Asphalt Oval)
 - Myrtle Beach Speedway - Myrtle Beach, South Carolina - (0.625 Mile Asphalt Oval)
 - Orange County Speedway - Rougemont, North Carolina - (3/8 Mile Asphalt Oval)

Winners list

Modified winners

Modified Lite winners

2014 Drivers results
(key) Bold - Pole position awarded by time.

2015 Drivers results
(key) Bold - Pole position awarded by time.

References

External links
Official website

2014 establishments in the United States
2016 disestablishments in the United States
Stock car racing series in the United States